The Legend of Dick and Dom is a sitcom that stars Dick and Dom as two budding young princes who are on a quest to find the antidote to a terrible plague that consumed their kingdom Fyredor because Dick accidentally dropped the original cure. The all star cast also includes Mannitol (Steve Furst), a wizard who is really bad at doing magic, and Lutin (Chloe Bale), a thief who was released from prison. They then put it in a special bottle to complete their potion. The programme is narrated by former Monty Python member Terry Jones. The show concluded with the series three finale, aired on 24 March 2011.

Episodes

Series overview

Series 1 (2009)

Series 2 (2010)

Series 3 (2011)

Guest stars
Several well-known faces from CBBC have played guest parts in The Legend of Dick and Dom. These include Kate Edmondson (Hider in the House), Ted Robbins (The Slammer), Phil Cornwell (who has appeared in various shows such as MI High and Dani's House), Dave Chapman (Dick and Dom in Da Bungalow) and Ian Kirkby (Dick and Dom in Da Bungalow and Harry Batt). Kirkby and Chapman have semi-regular roles throughout the series (see below). Fenella Fielding also started in the episode called Land of the Luvvies. 
There have also been guest appearances by veteran entertainers, including Alan Ford (The Armando Iannucci Shows) Ian Lavender (Dad's Army) and Stephen K. Amos (The Stephen K. Amos Show)

External links

References

BBC children's television shows
2000s British children's television series
2010s British children's television series
2009 British television series debuts
2011 British television series endings
English-language television shows
BBC television sitcoms
Period television series
2000s British teen sitcoms
Fantasy parodies
2010s British teen sitcoms
Television series by BBC Studios